Dynamic Ski is a skiing arcade game released by Taiyo System and Nichibutsu in 1984.

Reception 
In Japan, Game Machine listed Dynamic Ski on their April 15, 1984 issue as being the twenty-third most-successful table arcade unit of the month.

References

1984 video games
Nihon Bussan games
Arcade video games
Arcade-only video games
Skiing video games
Video games developed in Japan